Xenoscelinae is a subfamily of pleasing fungus beetles in the family Erotylidae. There are about 8 genera and 12 described species in Xenoscelinae.

Genera
These eight genera belong to the subfamily Xenoscelinae:
 Cryptophilus Reitter, 1874 i c g b
 Hapalips Reitter, 1877 i c g b
 Loberonotha Sen Gupta and Crowson, 1969 i c g
 Loberus LeConte, 1861 i c g b
 Pharaxonotha Reitter, 1875 i c g b
 Protoloberus Leschen, 2003 i c g
 Toramus Grouvelle, 1916 i c g b
 Truquiella b
Data sources: i = ITIS, c = Catalogue of Life, g = GBIF, b = Bugguide.net

References

Further reading

External links

 

Erotylidae